Rockapella is an American a cappella musical group formed in 1986 in New York City. The group's name is an amalgam of "rock" and "a cappella". Rockapella sings original vocal music and a cappella covers of pop and rock songs; and over time, their sound has evolved from high-energy pop and world music toward a more R&B-style sound. Rockapella initially found their biggest success in Japan throughout their career. They are also known for their role as a vocal house band and resident comedy troupe on the PBS children's geography game show Where in the World Is Carmen Sandiego?, based on the educational computer game of the same name developed and published by Broderbund.

In addition to three compilation albums in Japan, Rockapella has released 19 albums in the US and Japan. Since the band's vocal percussionist was hired, the line "All sounds provided by the voices and appendages of Rockapella" has been printed on each of their CDs.

Band history

Early years (1986–1990)
The founding members of Rockapella consisted of Brown University alumni Sean Altman, Elliott Kerman, Steve Keyes, and David Stix. They had each been in an a cappella group at Brown called High Jinks, but not all at the same time. Having been in High Jinks the longest, Altman was the only connection between the other three members; when they found with each other in New York City following their graduation, they decided to form Rockapella. The band began performing on New York City street corners in 1986 with a hat at their feet and a song repertoire that consisted of a mix of barbershop arrangements and a cappella renditions of classic doo wop pieces that evolved to focus less on oldies and barbershop and more on contemporary rock music. Passers-by began to drop business cards into the hat, and these street corner performances led to private party and club performances around NYC.

Stix left the group in 1987 to pursue his artistic career and was replaced by Charlie Evett. That same year, a dinner party performance for television personality Kathie Lee Gifford led to Rockapella's 1988 appearance on the WABC-TV show The Morning Show, Regis Philbin and Gifford's NYC morning talk show before it went national. Their performance of Altman's signature arrangement of the calypso novelty standard "Zombie Jamboree" caught the eye of producer Gerard Brown. He invited Rockapella to perform on the PBS "Great Performances" TV special Spike Lee & Company – Do It A Cappella, which would put them into the national spotlight. However, Evett left the group to continue a career in software design in 1988 before the special's taping, and Barry Carl was hired to take his place.

Where in the World Is Carmen Sandiego? (1991–1996)

With a PBS special and numerous morning talk show appearances under their collective belt, Rockapella was noticed by the producers of an up-and-coming children's geography game show Where in the World Is Carmen Sandiego?. Shortly before the show's premiere, Keyes had decided to leave Rockapella to launch his legal career, but was still part of the band when they auditioned and were hired to write and perform the show's theme song as well as appearing as the comic relief house band. Keyes was replaced by Scott Leonard, who had just returned from a career as the lead singer in a Tokyo Disneyland electronic rock band. Between Leonard joining the band and the start of their television break, Rockapella began to pick up fame, starring in a Whoopi Goldberg HBO comedy special Chez Whoopi, a Taco Bell commercial, and opened for acts such as Chuck Berry, Styx, Billy Joel, and their a cappella idols The Persuasions, who the group had met on the Do It A Cappella special. They also performed on Jay Leno's first New Year's Eve episode of The Tonight Show in 1992.

Rockapella first appeared on the half-hour game show in 1991 and later continued to appear daily for five seasons, catapulting the band's four members into mid-level television celebrity status and making the Rockapella-performed theme song (which was penned by Altman and his childhood friend, David Yazbek) as one of the best known television themes in history. Jeff Thacher joined Rockapella as the band's permanent vocal percussionist in 1993, although he only appeared on Carmen Sandiego during its fifth and final season two years later. While Rockapella was seen daily in homes across America, Leonard used his connections to the Japanese music market to acquire a recording contract with ForLife Records. The group released seven albums of original and cover material under this label in Japan during their run on Carmen Sandiego and for two years after that, being the first to bring contemporary a cappella music to Japan.

Post-Carmen Sandiego years (1997–present)

Following the end of Carmen Sandiego in 1996, Altman left Rockapella to pursue his solo career the following year, and was replaced by Kevin Wright; it was this line-up that would find itself gaining a boost in popularity in the late 1990s and the early 2000s. An American record label, two Folger's coffee commercials that ran between 1998 and 2001, and another PBS special of their December 9, 2000, concert brought Rockapella to be known as the front-runners of modern-day a cappella. In 2002, Carl hung up his pipes as bassist and was replaced by George Baldi III. In 2003, the group started their now annual "A Rockapella Holiday" tour, and in 2004, they released a live album, as well as re-released all of their previous North American albums on the independent label Shakariki Records. That same year, Kerman, the group's baritone and the last remaining founding member of the group, decided to leave Rockapella and was replaced by John K. Brown, a second tenor. This membership change initiated the era of, as the group refers to it, "The New Rockapella", in which the group has added more choreography and energy to their concert performances. Between 2005 and 2009, Rockapella focused on touring both domestically and around the world, continuing their popularity in North America and Japan while also boosting their newfound popularity in Europe and Asia in countries such as Germany, Switzerland, Singapore, and South Korea. Rockapella began joining the Boston Pops on stage in the eastern US in 2006, creating a concert experience that shows both the orchestra's and Rockapella's talents separately and together in a manner never done before: a cappella with instrumentation. In August 2009, Wright announced he would be leaving the group at the end of the year to spend more time with his family; his last performance with the band was on December 22 of that same year, and was replaced by Steven Dorian.

In August 2010, the group announced their first ever concert cruise through Galaxsea Travel aboard Carnival Cruise Lines' Glory. It took place on January 23–30, 2011 and included private concerts and a meet and greet cocktail party with Rockapella. On September 21, 2010, after much build up by the group since January, the band released Bang, their first full scale studio album since 2002, in digital format via iTunes, Amazon.com, and their website; physical CDs became available on October 21. On December 17, PAID Inc., the group's brand management and marketing resource, announced a partnership with Fairwood Studios that resulted in Rockapella becoming the first a cappella band to be featured in the Rock Band Network. The project to make "Bang", the title track off their newest album, the first track in Rock Band to feature full, four-instrument gameplay based on no live or synthesized instruments began in the summer of 2010, and was released for purchase on January 30, 2011 through the RBN. As shown by an accompanying video released through YouTube on Fairwood Studios' channel, the vocal player sings along with Leonard's lead, the guitarist strums to Brown and Dorian's backup vocals, the bass guitar player follows Baldi's bass vocals, and the player on the drums uses Thacher's vocal percussion as their notes. At the beginning of 2011, the band's cover of "It's A Small World" from their album Comfort & Joy, was featured in a TV commercial for the animated film Gnomeo and Juliet. Along with their usual holiday shows, Rockapella joined the Boston Pops in November and December 2011 for ten shows during their Christmas tour, a first for the band. On November 16, 2011, Rockapella released a new holiday album, A Rockapella Holiday, announcing the release via Facebook. In the spring of 2012, Rockapella revealed a new covers album was in the works, titled Motown & More, to accompany their live show of the same name. Just prior to release, a YouTube sampler of the forthcoming album tracks was posted & announced via Facebook, presenting song clips accompanied by album-related graphics. The album was released on March 15, 2013 on iTunes and is currently also available on Amazon.com & CDBaby.  The band released two music videos of original music on YouTube in 2013: "Pretty Much You" from Motown & More on May 21, 2013, and "4U4Now4Life" from Bang on September 10, 2013. In a Facebook post on October 14, Brown announced he would be leaving the group at the end of the month to enter the ministry full-time. He was replaced by Calvin Jones, who began performing with the group at their first Christmas show of 2013. After a run as substitute bass during the 2014 holiday tour, Ryan Chappelle, a former member of Boston's Ball In The House("BITH") officially replaced George Baldi as bass singer on band photos and other materials in early 2015, with Baldi periodically appearing on tour as a sub. On April 11, 2015, following two months of tour dates in Reno, NV and other western US cities, the group released a music video and studio single of one of the new songs from their stage show: a "mashup" of "Rock Around The Clock" and "Tell Me Something Good" featuring their new bass, and shot in and around Reno. On July 27, 2015, Funny or Die reunited four of the five Where in the World Is Carmen Sandiego? members on-camera (and the 5th via music only) to record & perform a comedy parody version of the TV theme song, regarding the recent escape & pursuit of Mexican drug lord El Chapo, entitled "Where In The World Is El Chapo?". On October 23, 2015, Mashable.com reunited Carmen Sandiego era member and theme song co-writer Sean Altman with members of the present group for a reunion interview & performance on the occasion of the 30th anniversary of the Carmen Sandiego franchise, as well as 24th anniversary of the television program. On February 9, 2016, the group released a music video and studio single on the occasion of Valentine's Day: an uptempo cover of "(The) Candy Man". In November 2019, Mitchell Rains left the group and was replaced by Jose Rosario.

In 2022, Jose Rosario left the group and was replaced by Manny Houston. Also, Bryant Vance left the group at that time as well, allowing George Baldi III to return.

Life after Rockapella
Most of the former members of Rockapella have remained in the singing business since their departures. Altman, Keyes, Evett, and non-Rockapella-member baritone Kevin Weist now comprise an a cappella group called The GrooveBarbers. They were cast in a nationwide television ad for Astelin nasal spray as The Astelins. They focus more on Altman's originals, barbershop arrangements, and a cappella doo wop than covers of pop songs. Altman has also released three solo albums and two Jewish comedy albums, one of which to go along with his solo comedy act Jewmongous. Kerman is working independently on jazz music compilations. Carl recorded a solo album, The SoLow Project, in 2004 and has pursued various musical and voice-over opportunities, as well as enjoying his semi-retirement. Kerman and Carl have joined The GrooveBarbers on stage on more than one occasion, and since 2008 have reunited with Altman and Keyes on five occasions, billing themselves as XRP. This regrouping of the 1988–1991 line up of Rockapella was originally scheduled to occur only twice: once as a practice gig on July 26, 2008, and a second time at the 2008 A Cappellastock in Ogden, Utah on August 23. However, XRP got together for a third show on April 17, 2009 and sang a song written by Carl and Altman on the Schoolhouse Rock!: Earth Rock soundtrack called "You Oughta Be Savin' Water". Following this, a fourth concert on December 13, 2012 was announced by Carl, and a fifth concert in support of the Harlem, New York City public school Central Park East 2 on February 1, 2014 was announced by Altman. Sean Altman has continued to release multiple singles & videos under both his name and that of Jewmongous, often in collaboration with Rockapella member Jeff Thacher as video director.

Personnel

 Current members
 Scott Leonard - High Tenor (1991–present)
 Jeff Thacher - Vocal Percussion (1993–present)
 Calvin Jones - Tenor (2013–present)
 George Baldi III - Bass (2002-2014, 2022-present)
 Manny Houston - Tenor (2022–present)

 Supporting musicians
 John K. Brown – Tenor (2014–present; substitute for Calvin Jones & Mitchell Rains)
 Ryan Chappelle - Bass (2016–present)
 Steven Dorian - Tenor (2016–present)
 Christopher Rossi – Tenor (2013–15); substitute for Steven Dorian, now Mitchell Rains)

 Former members
 Sean Altman - Tenor (1986-1997; founding member)
 Elliott Kerman - Baritone (1986-2004; founding member)
 Steve Keyes - High Tenor (1986-1991; founding member)
 David Stix - Bass (1986-1987; founding member)
 Charlie Evett - Bass (1987-1988)
 Barry Carl - Bass (1988-2002)
 Kevin Wright - Tenor (1997-2009)
 John K. Brown - Tenor (2004-2013)
 Bryant Vance - Bass (2016-2022)
 Ryan Chappelle - Bass (2014–2016)
 Steven Dorian - Tenor (2009–2016)
 Mitchell Rains - Tenor (2016-2019)
 Jose Rosario  - Tenor (2019–2022)

 Former supporting musicians
 Kenny X – Vocal percussion (1992; touring)
 David Yazbek – Vocal percussion (1992; session)
 Nathan Herron – Tenor (2014–???; substitute for Steven Dorian)
 Rolin E. Alexis – Bass (2014–???; substitute for George Baldi III and Ryan Chappelle)

Timeline

Discography

US albums

All albums from Don't Tell Me You Do through Comfort & Joy were re-released in the US by Shakariki Records in 2004.

Compilation albums

Miscellaneous albums

Singles and EPs

Other appearances

Solo albums and appearances

Songs used in commercials

 Gnomeo and Juliet - feature film trailer
 Folgers coffee
 NBC The Today Show promos for the earliest version of the program's "Where in the World is Matt Lauer?" segment. The song was re-recorded later in different styles by other musicians.
 Mounds/Almond Joy
 Doritos
 Mazola
 Kent Super Lights - Japan-only
 Showtime - (Became "We Got A Happy Holiday" song from Japan-only album "Bash")
 HBO
 Taco Bell
 Bacardi
 Budweiser
 AFLAC insurance
 ProScan televisions
 Arby's
 Ozone Ford - Long Island, NY dealership (now defunct)
 Tools To Help You Choose (an infomercial about the TV Ratings System) feat. Bob Keeshan (aka Captain Kangaroo)
 BuiltBar Health Bars
 The Big Con, a 2021 video game

Filmography
 WPIX's 40th Anniversary (1988, guest appearance)
 Comic Strip Live (1989, guest appearance)
 Spike Lee & Co. Do It A Capella (1990, guest appearance)
 Where in the World Is Carmen Sandiego? (1991-1995, house band and comedy troupe)
 Chez Whoopi (1991, guest appearance)
 Zappa's Universe (1991, guest appearance)
 The Tonight Show (1992, guest appearance)
 The Biggest Little Ticket (1993, guest appearance)
 The 1996 Orange Bowl Parade
 Joe's Apartment (1996, were the voices of The Roach Chorus)
 Happily Ever After: Fairy Tales for Every Child (1997, were the voices of The Five Little Piggies in the special, "Mother Goose: A Rapping and Rhyming Special")
 Penn & Teller's Sin City Spectacular (1998, guest appearance)
 Where in the Universe Is Carmen Sandiego? (1999)
 The 1999 Macy's Thanksgiving Day Parade
 So You Think You Can Dance Canada (2011, guest appearance)

Notes

References

External links

 Official website

Professional a cappella groups
Musical groups established in 1986
Musical groups from New York City
1986 establishments in New York City
American vocal groups